3-Bromocytisine is a derivative of the toxic alkaloid cytisine that acts as a highly potent agonist at neural nicotinic acetylcholine receptors, binding primarily to the α4β2 and α7 subtypes. 3-Bromocytisine is a full agonist at the α7 subtype while it is only a partial agonist at α4β2, but has an extremely strong binding affinity at α4β2 with 200-fold selectivity for α4β2 over α7. In animal studies 3-bromocytisine stimulates the release of dopamine and noradrenaline and increases locomotor activity.

References 

Nicotinic agonists
Nitrogen heterocycles
Lactams
Organobromides